The municipality of Tupambaé is one of the nine municipalities of Cerro Largo Department, Uruguay. Its seat is the city of Tupambaé.

Location 
The municipality lies on the southwest area of the Cerro Largo Department.

History 
Through Decree N° 11/13 of 15 April 2013, the Departmental Board of Cerro Largo, following the proposal of the Departmental government, decreed the creation of a new municipality in the settlement of Tupambaé. This decree used the mechanism provided by the Law N° 18567 that allowed the creation of municipalities in settlements with less than 2000 inhabitants, provided that there is approval by the Departmental Board at the initiative of the Intendant. With Law N° 19319, under the directives of the Law N° 19272, its creation was effective and constituencies GGA and GGC of Cerro Largo Department were assigned to this municipality, while its territory was limited to the urban and suburban area of the corresponding cadastral locality.

However, in 25 October 2018, the Decree of the Departmental Board N° 28/2018 expanded the territory of the municipality, making it reach all of that corresponding to the constituencies of GGA and GGC.

Authorities 
The authority of the municipality is the Municipal Council, integrated by the Mayor (who presides it) and four Councilors.

References 

Tupambaé
States and territories established in 2013
2013 establishments in Uruguay